New PowerChutes (Pty) Ltd (also called New Powerchutes) was a South African aircraft manufacturer based in Alberton, Gauteng. The company specialized in the design and manufacture of powered parachutes in the form of ready-to-fly aircraft.

The company seems to have been founded about 2001 and gone out of business in 2006. The Managing Director was Tim Stiff. The company was a proprietary company under South African law.

The company produced the New PowerChutes Gemini, a two-seat powered parachute design.

Aircraft

References

External links
Company website archives on Archive.org

Defunct aircraft manufacturers of South Africa
Companies based in Ekurhuleni
Ultralight aircraft
Powered parachutes